Hotel Dili is a hotel on the waterfront in Dili, East Timor, established in 1933. It was purchased by Australian Frank Favaro (1935-2000) in 1971. In 1975, Favaro harbored six Australians at the hotel during a battle, although they were said to "consistently refuse offers of evacuation." The hotel had to be evacuated at one point due to an attack. Jane Nicholls describes the hotel as "wacky" and "East Timor's own Fawlty Towers."

References

External links
Official site

Hotels in East Timor
Hotel Dili
Hotels established in 1933